South Dayi is one of the constituencies represented in the Parliament of Ghana. It elects one Member of Parliament (MP) by the first past the post system of election. South Dayi is located in the South Dayi district  of the Volta Region of Ghana.

Boundaries
The constituency is located within the South Dayi District of the Volta Region of Ghana. It has the North Dayi constituency to the north, the Hohoe South constituency to the north-east, and the Ho West to the east and south. Its western neighbours are the Afram Plains South and the Asuogyaman constituencies, both in the Eastern Region of Ghana.

Members of Parliament

Elections

See also
List of Ghana Parliament constituencies

References

External links
Adam Carr's Election Archives
Election Passport - American University

Parliamentary constituencies in the Volta Region